Chris Casamassa (born January 17, 1965) is an American martial artist, actor and stuntman who is best known for his role as Scorpion in the movie Mortal Kombat and the related TV show, Mortal Kombat: Conquest. He is the son of martial arts guru and Red Dragon Karate founder Louis D. Casamassa. (Chris co-starred on the TV series WMAC Masters under the call-sign "Red Dragon".)

Karate
Casamassa is also the President of the successful Red Dragon Karate Schools, which were founded by his father. As a national competitor on the North American Sport Karate Association circuit (N.A.S.K.A) Casamassa was the #1 forms competitor in the country for four consecutive years.

Life and career
Chris started his martial arts training in 1969 at the age of 4. He made his first degree Black belt at the age of 10. His professional tournament career started in 1982 and when he retired from professional competition in 1992 he had amassed a string of titles: He was a 4 time national open forms champion, along with 2 national weapons titles, and a top 5 rated middleweight fighter. He then began a career in film and television, his most recognizable role being Scorpion in Mortal Kombat. His accomplishments in martial arts training continued during this time; he was awarded his 8th degree Black Belt in Red Dragon Karate in 2004.

Filmography

References

https://www.tvguide.com/celebrities/chris-casamassa/credits/3030292983/

External links 
 http://www.chriscasamassa.com
 

American stunt performers
American male film actors
American male television actors
1965 births
Living people
American male karateka
Shōrin-ryū practitioners